Satish Nagarajaiah is an Indian-American academic professor, who teaches and conducts research in the departments of civil engineering and of mechanical engineering at Rice University. He was elected in 2019 to the United States National Academy of Inventors. He got elected in 2021 as Distinguished Member of American Society of Civil Engineers for achieving eminence in structural engineering, in 2017 as fellow of the American Society of Civil Engineers, and in 2012 as fellow of ASCE's Structural Engineering Institute. He has been honored with the 2020 Nathan N. Newmark Medal, 2017 Reese Research Prize, 2015 Leon S. Moisseiff Award from the ASCE. He is considered an authority in seismic isolation and adaptive stiffness structural systems and is known for his contributions to structural engineering.

Early life and education 
He received a bachelor's degree in structural engineering from Bangalore University in 1980 and completed his Master's in Civil Engineering from the Indian Institute of Science, Banglore, in 1982. After completing his education in India, he worked as the lead structural engineer with Tata Consulting Engineers till 1986. He earned his Ph.D. (1987-1990) from The State University of New York at Buffalo, where he worked as a postdoctoral researcher till 1993, and then as an assistant  professor at the University of Missouri in Columbia from the year 1993 to 1998. In 1999, he joined the Rice University faculty.

Career 
Nagarajaiah’s career involves teaching, research, consulting, and service focused on Structural dynamics, Seismic isolation, Structural control, Monitoring, Sparse System Identification, Sensing with Nanomaterials, and Physics Guided Machine Learning.

During and after obtaining his Ph.D. he worked with UB's MCEER researchers and co-authored nine technical reports for the Multidisciplinary Center for Earthquake Engineering Research (MCEER) with Andrei M Reinhorn and Michael Constantinou and other collaborators on three different federal grants. He developed the 3-D BASIS class of computer programs for the response-history analysis of seismically isolated buildings while researching through MCEER. These programs featured developments that Computers and Structures later adopted to develop the widely-used programs, SAP2000 and ETABS.

Nagarajaiah has invented numerous devices and systems to protect structures from damaging vibrations, including those caused by earthquakes. These include semiactive and smart systems with variable stiffness and adaptive passive versions of both tuned mass dampers and negative stiffness systems.

He has also co-invented structural monitoring technologies that include strain-sensing nanomaterials and noncontact, laser-based smart strain-sensing skin. He has also developed advanced nonlinear structural dynamic analysis techniques that have been widely used to analyze and design structures, including the United States Court of Appeals for the Ninth Circuit, San Francisco International Airport, Exxon, and Apple Inc. He holds four patents in the field of structural engineering.

He has served on the American Society of Civil Engineers's Structural Engineering Institute Board of Governors from 2015 to 2019. He was the founding chair of the ASCE-Engineering Mechanics Institute (EMI) structural health monitoring committee from 2004-2006. He also served as chair of the ASCE SEI structural control and sensing committee from 1998-2002.

Published works 
He served as the managing editor of ASCE's Journal of Structural Engineering from 2011-2018. He is the editor of the Structural Control & Health Monitoring International Journal, published by Wiley, and editor-in-chief of the Structural Monitoring & Maintenance International Journal (North America edition), published by Techno-press. He has also authored two books and has published over 350 journal and  conference articles.

Books

Honors and awards 
Nagarajaiah has received the following accolades for his research and work;
 In  May 2021, Nagarajaiah was named a distinguished member of the American Society of Civil Engineers (ASCE), the highest honor bestowed by ASCE.
 He was awarded the 2020 Nathan N. Newmark Medal from the American Society of Civil Engineers (ASCE), Engineering Mechanics Institute, and Structural Engineering Institute (SEI) in March 2020.
 In November 2020, he with his coauthor, won the Takuji Kobori Prize from the International Association of Structural Control and Monitoring (IASCM) for 2019 based on their paper Bayesian structural identification of a hysteretic negative stiffness earthquake protection system using unscented Kalman filtering.
 He was elected into the National Academy of Inventors in December 2019.
 He received the 2017 Raymond C. Reese Research Prize from the Engineering Institute of the American Society of Civil Engineers (ASCE) in February 2017.
 In 2016, he was ranked among the top 25 most cited researchers in civil engineering in Elsevier and Shanghai's Global Ranking of Academics.
 In January 2015, Satish Nagarajaiah was honored with the Leon S. Moisseiff Award for 2015 by the American Society of Civil Engineers (ASCE) for his research in the field of Structural design.
 In 2012, the Structural Engineering Institute (SEI) of ASCE named him an inaugural fellow of SEI.
 He was honored with a National Science Foundation's Early CAREER award for innovative research in Adaptive Stiffness Structures in 1999.

See also 
 Michael Constantinou

References 

Living people
Year of birth missing (living people)
Place of birth missing (living people)
Indian Institute of Science alumni
University at Buffalo alumni
University Visvesvaraya College of Engineering alumni
Bangalore University alumni
Indian expatriate academics
Indian expatriates in the United States
Rice University faculty
University of Missouri faculty
American academics of Indian descent